Quyujoq (also Romanized as Qūyūjoq; also known as Kūjīkh and Qūjūq) is a village in Anzal-e Jonubi Rural District, Anzal District, Urmia County, West Azerbaijan Province, Iran. At the 2006 census, its population was 93, in 14 families.

References 

Populated places in Urmia County